Erjon Kastrati (born 30 December 1994) is a Kosovan professional basketball player for KB Trepça of the Kosovo Basketball Superleague. He is a 1.98 m tall shooting guard and small forward.
Erjon Kastrati and his friend Gezim Morina made history by helping KB Ylli to win  Liga Unike and Kosovo Basketball Superleague for the first time in history of the club.

Honours 

Slovenian League
Winners (3): 2012–13, 2013–14, 2017-18

Slovenian Cup
Winners (3): 2014, 2015, 2016

Slovenian Supercup
Winners (2): 2014, 2016

Kosovo Basketball Superleague
Winners (2): 2021, 2022

Liga Unike:
Winners (1): 2021

Liga Unike Supercup
Winners (2): 2021, 2022

External links
 Profile at abaliga.com
 Profile at eurobasket.com

1994 births
Living people
ABA League players
KK Krka players
KK Olimpija players
Kosovan men's basketball players
Shooting guards
Slovenian men's basketball players
Slovenian people of Kosovan descent
Small forwards
Sportspeople from Pristina
KB Ylli players